Ceretes marcelserres is a moth in the Castniidae family. It is found in south-eastern Brazil and Paraguay.

References

Moths described in 1824
Castniidae